The Science of Team Science (SciTS) is a field of scientific philosophy and methodology which advocates using cross-disciplinary collaboration from diverse scientific fields to solve present-day problems. The field encompasses conceptual and methodological strategies aimed at understanding and enhancing the processes and outcomes of collaborative, team-based research. 

It is useful to distinguish between Team Science (TS) initiatives and the Science of Team Science (SciTS) field. Team science initiatives are designed to promote collaborative, and often cross-disciplinary (which includes multidisciplinary, interdisciplinary, and transdisciplinary) approaches to answering research questions about particular phenomena. The SciTS field, on the other hand, is concerned with understanding and managing circumstances that facilitate or hinder the effectiveness of collaborative science, and evaluating the outcomes of collaborative science. Its principal units of analysis are the research, training, and community-based translational initiatives implemented by both public and private sector organizations.

The SciTS field focuses on understanding and enhancing the antecedent conditions, collaborative processes, and outcomes associated with team science initiatives, including their scientific discoveries, educational outcomes, and translations of research findings into new practices, patents, products, technical advances, and policies.

History
Since the 1990s, there has been a growing interest and investment in large-scale, team-based research initiatives to address problems that require cross-disciplinary collaboration. The rise in team science parallels the increase in specialization among scientists. The rapid growth and accumulation of specialized knowledge in multiple fields has created a need to establish partnerships among scientists and practitioners drawn from several different fields in order to address complex environmental, social, and public health problems.

The interdisciplinary nature of SciTS initially emerged from practical concerns on the part of funding agencies, which needed to gauge the performance of team science, understand its added value, determine the return on investment of large research initiatives, and inform science policy. The term "Science of Team Science" was first introduced in October, 2006, at a conference called The Science of Team Science: Assessing the Value of Transdisciplinary Research, hosted by the National Cancer Institute, in Bethesda, Maryland. The emerging SciTS field was further developed in a supplement to the American Journal of Preventive Medicine, published in July 2008. Two years later, the First Annual International Science of Team Science (SciTS) Conference was held on April 22–24, 2010 in Chicago, Illinois, organized by the Northwestern University Clinical and Translational Sciences (NUCATS) Institute. The Chicago conference brought together team science investigators and practitioners from a broad range of disciplines, including translational research; organizational behavior; social, cognitive, and health psychology; communications; complex systems; evaluation science; technology; and management.

As a developing field of inquiry, the terminology, methodologies, and outcomes of SciTS are still being debated and defined, and new hypotheses regarding the most effective strategies for implementing and sustaining team science are beginning to be tested and the results published. While the SciTS literature base is currently limited, the field is founded on a body of knowledge of team research conducted by scholars in diverse fields such as organizational science, community health promotion, and social psychology, as well as from groups outside academia, including business and the military. SciTS research findings are starting to be translated into evidence-based tools and support structures that aim to improve the efficiency and success of team science initiatives.

In 2013, the National Academy of Sciences established a National Research Council Committee on the Science of Team Science to evaluate the current state of knowledge and practice in the SciTS field.  A Committee report was published in 2015.

In 2021, Dr. David Lady, one of the original Science of Teams practitioners, published his field notes providing a tested philosophical framework.

Methods
The methods and measures used to evaluate team science evolve with the interdiscipline of SciTS. The definition of a successful team may be different depending on the stakeholder. For example, funding agencies may be more interested in performance measures related to the translation of team research findings to practical applications, whereas team researchers may use the number of publications produced and amount grant funding obtained to gauge the success of a Team Science endeavor. In addition, the method of evaluation and metrics of success may vary at different points during the team research project. Short-term measures may include indicators of synergistic output, whereas long-term measures may be related to the impact of the research on the evolution of a discipline or the development of public policy.

SciTS uses both qualitative and quantitative methods to evaluate the antecedent conditions, collaborative processes, and outcomes associated with team science, as well as the organizational, social, and political context that influences team science. These methods include approaches such as surveys, ethnographic observation, case studies, and interviews of members of science teams; social network, mapping and visualization techniques (e.g., graphical representations of collaboration formation and dissolution, geographic distribution of collaborators, funding patterns, patent awards, time to production and commercialization, etc.); and bibliometric analyses (e.g., assessment of co-authored papers and grants).

The field would benefit from science agencies and associated policies to put into place advanced computational infrastructures, which will enable the analysis of terabytes of data to identify the factors that contribute to or hinder the success of science teams. Ideally, evaluation of team science initiatives is performed in real time, during active collaborations, so that the information results can be fed back to the scientific team to enhance its efficiency and effectiveness.

Tools
Scientists engaged in team science collaborations have traditionally relied on heuristics to make team science work. Through only their own experiences—what might be called the art of team science—they have tried to discern what facilitates team science and what obstacles stand in the way of a collaboration's success. By studying the practice of team science, SciTS researchers aim to develop a set of evidence-based tools and recommendations that can then be used to improve the efficiency and effectiveness of team science initiatives. For example, SciTS researchers may identify approaches to facilitate the formation and function of successful collaborative science teams, remove inter-institutional barriers to team science, support effective collaboration among researchers who work together within a team, and develop team science training programs.

Progress is being made on a few fronts toward the development of practical tools and recommendations to support the team science process. The SciTS research community is working toward the creation of an evidence base for the development of a set of "effective practices", which can be incorporated into team science training to ensure that the next generation of scientists develops the skills necessary to engage in effective team science. Several groups are developing team science "toolboxes" or "toolkits" that provide resources that can assist researchers with the collaborative science process, including guiding questions that support discussion on collaborative goals and common metrics of success and assigning individual tasks and responsibilities; guidelines for developing a shared "language" that can be used among researchers from different disciplinary backgrounds; models for communications infrastructure that can support geographically dispersed collaborations; tools for assessing team members' readiness to collaborate; curricula for training team members in skills for team science; and model "prenuptial agreements" for collaborators that can help to establish agreement on rights to authorship and patents that result from scientific collaborations. Other groups are developing online social networking tools to help scientists identify potential collaborators, and creating centralized databases of measures and instruments that can be used by SciTS researchers, program evaluators, or those who are engaged in team science to assess the processes and outcomes of team science initiatives.

See also
 Improvement Science Research Network
 Integrative learning
 Interactional expertise
 Interdisciplinarity
 Multidisciplinarity
 Multidimensional network
 Research development
 Science and technology studies
 Transdisciplinarity
 Transdisciplinary studies
 Global brain

References

Further reading

 Aboelela SW, Merrill JA, Carley KM, Larson E. Social network analysis to evaluate an interdisciplinary research center. J Research Admin. 2007;XXXVIII:97–108.
 Azoulay P, Joshua S, Zivin JW. Superstar Extinction. Q J Econ. 2010;125:549–589.
 Bennett LM, Gadlin H, Levine-Finley S. Collaboration and team science: a field guide. Bethesda, MD: National Institutes of Health; 2010. Accessed May 28, 2010.

 Börner K, Penumarthy S, Meiss M, Ke W. Mapping the diffusion of information among major U.S. research institutions. Scientometrics. 2006;68:416–426.
 Bos N, Zimmerman A, Olson J, et al. From shared databases to communities of practice: a taxonomy of collaboratories. J Computer-Mediated Comm. 2007;12:Article 16.
 Collins F. Opportunities for research and NIH. Science. 2010;327:36–37.
 
 Contractor NS, Monge PR. Managing knowledge networks. Management Comm Q. 2002;16:249–258.
 Cummings JN, Kiesler S. Coordination costs and project outcomes in multi-university collaborations. Res Policy. 2007;36:1620–1634.
 Cummings JN, Kiesler S. Collaborative research across disciplinary and organizational boundaries. Soc Stud Sci. 2005;35:703–722.
 Cummings JN. A socio-technical framework for identifying team science collaborations that could benefit from cyberinfrastructure. VOSS: National Science Foundation; 2009.
 Editorial Staff. Who'd want to work in a team? Nature. 2003;424:1.
 Fiore SM. Interdisciplinarity as teamwork – How the science of teams can inform team science. Small Group Res. 2008;39:251–277.
 Guimerà R, Uzzi B, Spiro J, Amaral L. Team assembly mechanisms determine collaboration network structure and team performance. Science. 2005;308:697–702.
 Hall KL, Stokols D, Moser RP, et al. The collaboration readiness of transdisciplinary research teams and centers findings from the National Cancer Institute's TREC Year-One evaluation study. Am J Prevent Med. 2008;35:S161-S172.
 Helbing D. (2010) The FuturIcT Knowledge Accelerator: unleashing the power of information for a sustainable future. arXiv:1004.4969.
 Huang Y, Contractor N, Yao Y. CI-KNOW: Recommendation based on social networks. Paper presented at: 2009 Annual Conference for Digital Government, May 18–21, 2008, Montreal, Canada.
 Keyton J, Ford DJ, Smith FL. A meso-level communicative model of interorganizational collaboration. Comm Theory. 2008;18:376–406.
 Klein JT. Crossing Boundaries: Knowledge, Disciplinarities, and Interdisciplinarities. Charlottesville, VA: University Press of Virginia. 1996.
 Klein JT. Evaluating interdisciplinary and transdisciplinary collaborative research: a review of the state of the art. Am J Prevent Med. 2008;35:S116-123.
 Miller K. Successful collaborations: social scientists who study science have noticed a trend. Biomed Comp Rev. 2008:7–15.
 Monge PR, Contractor N. Theories of Communication Networks. New York: Oxford University Press. 2003.
 Nash JM. Transdisciplinary training programs: key components and prerequisites for success. Am J Prevent Med. 2008;35: S133-S140.
 Newman MEJ. Coauthorship networks and patterns of scientific collaboration. Proc Natl Acad Sci. 2004;101:5200–5205.
 Olson G, Olson JS. Distance matters. Human-Computer Interact. 2000;15:139–178.
 Olson, G, Zimmerman, A, & Bos, N. Scientific Collaboration on the Internet." Cambridge, MA: MIT Press 2008.
 Rhoten D, Parker A. Risks and rewards of an interdisciplinary research path. Science. 2004;306:2046-2046.
 Rhoten D. The dawn of networked science. The Chronicle Review. 2007;54. Accessed May 28, 2010.
 Rosenfield PL. The potential of transdisciplinary research for sustaining and extending linkages between the health and social sciences. Soc Sci Med. 1992;35(11):1343–1357.
 Shrum W, Genuth J, Chompalov I. Structures of Scientific Collaboration. Cambridge, MA: The MIT Press. 2007.
 Stipelman B, Feng A, Hall K, et al. The relationship between collaborative readiness and scientific productivity in the Transdisciplinary Research on Energetics and Cancer (TREC) centers. Ann Behav Med. 2010;39:S143.
 Stokols D, Taylor B, Hall K, Moser R. The science of team science: an overview of the field. Bethesda, MD: National Cancer Institute. 2006. Accessed May 28, 2010.
 Stokols D. Toward a science of transdisciplinary action research. Am J Comm Psychol. 2006;38:63–77.
 Trochim WM, Marcus SE, Masse LC, Moser RP, Weld PC. The evaluation of large research initiatives: a participatory integrative mixed-methods approach. Am J Eval. 2008;29:8–28.
 Wellman B, White HD, Nazer N. Does citation reflect social structure? Longitudinal evidence from the "Globenet" interdisciplinary research group. JASIST. 2004;55:111–126.
 Whitfield J. Group theory. Nature''. 2008;455:720–723.

External links
 Annual International Science of Team Science Conference
 University Clinical and Translational Sciences, Team Science Resources
 National Cancer Institute Science of Team Science website
 Interdisciplinary Network for Group Research (INGroup)
 Interest in Measuring, Mapping & Evaluating Interdisciplinary Research (IDR)
 Philosophy of/as Interdisciplinarity (PIN)
 Integration and Implementation Sciences (I2S)
 Center for the Study of Interdisciplinarity (CSID)
  Improvement Science Research Network (ISRN)
 Team Science eTraining Tools (COALESCE)
 The Science of Teams Framework
NCI Team Science Toolkit
   On-line learning modules

Academia
Scientific method
Pedagogy
Group processes